Helina maculipennis is a long fly from the family Muscidae.

References

Muscidae
Diptera of Europe
Insects described in 1845
Taxa named by Johan Wilhelm Zetterstedt